ELAV-like protein 3 is a protein that in humans is encoded by the ELAVL3 gene.

A member of the ELAVL protein family, ELAV-like 3 is a neural-specific RNA-binding protein which contains three RNP-type RNA recognition motifs. The observation that ELAVL3 is one of several Hu antigens (neuronal-specific RNA-binding proteins) recognized by the anti-Hu serum antibody present in sera from patients with paraneoplastic encephalomyelitis and sensory neuronopathy (PEM/PSN) suggests it has a role in neurogenesis. Two alternatively spliced transcript variants encoding distinct isoforms have been found for this gene.

References

Further reading